Thompson Center may refer to:
 James R. Thompson Center, an office building in Chicago, Illinois
 Thompson Center Arms, an American firearms company